Helix High School, in La Mesa, California, is a charter high school built in 1952. It received its charter in 1998. Part of the Grossmont Union High School District, it serves a mid-level socioeconomic community and has a student body of approximately 2,400 pupils. Helix serves parts of La Mesa, Lemon Grove, and Spring Valley; however, as a charter school, all high school students in the state of California are eligible to attend.

Helix High School is accredited by the Western Association of Schools and Colleges (WASC) and is a California Distinguished School in 2001 and 2009.

History
Helix Charter High School opened as the second high school in the Grossmont Union High School District in September 1951, to relieve record enrollment of 3000 at Grossmont High School. Its first principal was Benton Hart. In November 1950, East County voters overwhelmingly approved a local bond issue for $1.9 million that financed "the University Avenue high school." Helix's first year of studies were held at Grossmont while the new campus was being built. The two schools operated on double sessions that year.

Helix, receiving half of Grossmont High School's students,  attended class in the afternoon.  Grossmont's 1500 students attended in the morning. Because of rapid population growth in the area, Helix soon grew overcrowded itself. This resulted in plans to build and open El Cajon Valley High School four years after the opening of Helix.

Remodeling

Since the opening of the school, much of the campus and technology has deteriorated or become outdated. With voter approval of Proposition H in 2004 and Proposition U in 2008, Helix High School will undergo remodeling projects. These projects include a new administration building, a new science building, a new performing arts center, and remodeling of all standard classrooms.

The remodeling of the campus has already started, and has been completed for buildings 10, 100, 200, 300, 400, 500, 600, 700, 1100, 1140, 1200 the new science building (1800), the performing arts center (900) and the lecture hall (1300), which officially opened in January 2014. The remaining buildings to be remodeled include 1000 (Gym), and 1600 (cafeteria). Building 800 has been demolished, and the new Administration/Student Services Office is located in its old location. In addition to the renovation efforts of the campus buildings, all of the landscaping on the school grounds will be rehabilitated.

Traditions

Bagpipe Band
Helix Charter's pipe band includes several pipers and a drum corps consisting of several snare drummers, tenor drummers, and one bass drummer. During autumn, the bagpipe band accompanies the Helix Highlander Band in parades, football games, and sometimes field competitions. Additionally, they march the varsity football team out onto the field before home games. During the rest of the year, the pipe band frequently performs at paid as well as volunteer gigs, and competes at various Scottish Highland Games in Southern California. The bagpipe band is funded by the  Helix Instrumental Music Association.

Battle for the Musket
Every year since the school's opening in 1952, Helix and Grossmont High School have competed against each other for this musket, given to the winner of the Grossmont vs. Helix varsity football game. Typically, this football game is one of the most attended of the season. This is just one of several weapon-themed rivalry games that Helix holds with the surrounding high schools.

Notable alumni
Lalo Alcaraz, 1982, American cartoonist most famous for creating the first nationally syndicated, politically themed Latino daily comic strip La Cucaracha.
 Evan Arapostathis, former NFL punter
 Reggie Bush, 2003, former NFL running back for the New Orleans Saints, Miami Dolphins, Detroit Lions, San Francisco 49ers, and the Buffalo Bills
 Chuck Cecil, 1983, former NFL free safety for the Green Bay Packers, Phoenix Cardinals, and Houston Oilers; currently defensive coordinator for the Tennessee Titans
 Kerry Chater, 1964, songwriter; bass guitarist for Gary Puckett and the Union Gap
 Karl Dorrell, 1982, college football coach
 Bruce Gillingham, 1977, U.S. Navy Surgeon General
 Dennis Hopper, 1954, actor, artist, and film director
 Cordelia Mendoza, 1967, antiques expert, appraiser and philanthropist
 Wilbert Olinde, 1973, basketball player
 Kyra Phillips, 1986, news anchor, Cable News Network (CNN)
Barry Pressing, 1967, contemporary artist and sculptor living in Australia
Marc Raab, former NFL center
 Jake Reed, 2011, baseball player
 Brandon Sanders, former NFL defensive back
 Cathy Scott, 1967, true crime author and national journalist
 Alex Smith, 2002, former NFL quarterback, San Francisco 49ers, Kansas City Chiefs, Washington Redskins / Football Team, and #1 overall pick in the 2005 NFL Draft
 Casey Tiumalu, 1979, former NFL running back, 1987 Los Angeles Rams, BYU 
 Levine Toilolo, 2008, NFL tight end for the Atlanta Falcons, San Francisco 49ers and Detroit Lions 
 Bill Walton, 1970, sportscaster and former National Basketball Association (NBA) Hall of Fame center Portland Trail Blazers, Boston Celtics and San Diego Clippers (now the Los Angeles Clippers); Center for the UCLA Bruins
Bruce Walton, former NFL offensive lineman for the Dallas Cowboys
 Todd Watkins, 2001, former NFL wide receiver for the Oakland Raiders
 Leon White, 1980, former NFL linebacker, 1986–1991 Cincinnati Bengals, 1992–1993 Los Angeles Rams

See also
 List of high schools in San Diego County, California
 List of high schools in California

References

External links
 Helix High School
 Grossmont Union High School District

High schools in San Diego County, California
La Mesa, California
Charter high schools in California
Educational institutions established in 1952
School buildings completed in 1952
1952 establishments in California